A Mineral Love is the seventh studio album by electronic musician Bibio, his fourth studio release on Warp Records. It was released on 1 April 2016.

Reception
At Metacritic, which assigns a weighted average score out of 100 to reviews from mainstream critics, A Mineral Love received an average score of 77% based on 11 reviews, indicating "generally favorable reviews".

Track listing

Charts

References

External links
 

2016 albums
Bibio albums
Warp (record label) albums